The Maykop culture (scientific transliteration: Majkop,), c. 3700 BC–3000 BC, was a major Bronze Age archaeological culture in the western Caucasus region.

It extends along the area from the Taman Peninsula at the Kerch Strait to near the modern border of Dagestan and southwards to the Kura River. The culture takes its name from a royal burial, the Maykop kurgan in the Kuban River valley.

According to genetic studies on ancient DNA published in 2018, the Maykop population came from the south, from Imereti, and was descended from the Chalcolithic farmers known as Darkveti-Meshoko who first colonized the north side of the Caucasus. Maykop is therefore the "ideal archaeological candidate for the founders of the Northwest Caucasian language family".

Territory

In the south, the Maykop culture bordered the approximately contemporaneous Kura-Araxes culture (3500—2200 BC), which extends into the Armenian Plateau and apparently influenced it. To the north is the Yamna culture, including the Novotitorovka culture (3300—2700), which it overlaps in territorial extent. It is contemporaneous with the late Uruk period in Mesopotamia.

The Kuban River is navigable for much of its length and provides an easy water-passage via the Sea of Azov to the territory of the Yamna culture, along the Don and Donets River systems. The Maykop culture was thus well-situated to exploit the trading possibilities with the central Ukraine area.

New data revealed the similarity of artifacts from the Maykop culture with those found recently in the course of excavations of the ancient city of Tell Khazneh in northern Syria, the construction of which dates back to 4000 BC.

Radiocarbon dates for various monuments of the Maykop culture are from 3950 - 3650 - 3610 - 2980 calBC.
 
After the discovery of the Leyla-Tepe culture in the 1980s, some links were noted with the Maykop culture.

The Leyla-Tepe culture is a culture of archaeological interest from the Chalcolithic era. Its population was distributed on the southern slopes of the Central Caucasus (modern Azerbaijan, Agdam District), from 4350 until 4000 B.C. Similar amphora burials in the South Caucasus are found in the Western Georgian Jar-Burial Culture. 

The culture has also been linked to the north Ubaid period monuments, in particular, with the settlements in the Eastern Anatolia Region. The settlement is of a typical Western-Asian variety, with the dwellings packed closely together and made of mud bricks with smoke outlets. 

It has been suggested that the Leyla-Tepe were the founders of the Maykop culture. An expedition to Syria by the Russian Academy of Sciences revealed the similarity of the Maykop and Leyla-Tepe artifacts with those found recently while excavating the ancient city of Tel Khazneh I, from the 4th millennium BC.

In 2010, nearly 200 Bronze Age sites were reported stretching over 60 miles from the Kuban River to Nalchik, at an altitude of between 4,620 feet and 7,920 feet. They were all "visibly constructed according to the same architectural plan, with an oval courtyard in the center, and connected by roads."

Culture

Art 
In the early 20th century, researchers established the existence of a local Maykop animal style in the artifacts found. This style was seen as the prototype for animal styles of later archaeological cultures: the Maykop animal style is more than a thousand years older than the Scythian, Sarmatian and Celtic animal styles.

Attributed to the Maykop culture are petroglyphs which have yet to be deciphered.

Horse breeding 
The Maykop people lived sedentary lives, and horses formed a very low percentage of their livestock, which mostly consisted of pigs and cattle.

Archaeologists have discovered a unique form of bronze cheek-piece, which consists of a bronze rod with a twisted loop in the middle that threads through the nodes and connects to the bridle, halter strap, and headband. Notches and bumps on the edges of the cheek-pieces were, apparently, to attach nose and under-lip straps.

Some of the earliest wagon wheels in the world are found in Maykop culture area. The two solid wooden wheels from the kurgan of Novokorsunskaya in the Kuban region have been dated to the second half of the fourth millennium.

Terrace agriculture 
The construction of artificial terrace complexes in the mountains is evidence of their sedentary living, high population density, and high levels of agricultural and technical skills. The terraces were built around the fourth millennium BC. and all subsequent cultures used them for agricultural purposes. The vast majority of pottery found on the terraces are from the Maykop period, the rest from the Scythian and Alan period. The Maykop terraces are among the most ancient in the world, but they are little studied. The longevity of the terraces (more than 5000 years) allows us to consider their builders unsurpassed engineers and craftsmen.

Origins

Colchis region
Based on Wang (2018), David W. Anthony (2019) notes that "the Maikop population was descended from the Eneolithic farmers [that] came from the south, probably from western Georgia. [the Darkveti-Meshoko culture], and are the ideal archaeological candidate for the founders of the Northwest Caucasian language family." He also notes that the Bronze Age Maykop individuals tested by Wang (2018) could not have contributed to the Yamnaya gene pool, Yamnaya being the archeological culture most likely connected to the spread of Indo-European languages. Wang (2018) further found that 'Steppe Maykop' (a population related to the Maykop culture) probably had a minor East Asian-related component, which was estimated at ~9.6% of their ancestry.

Pontic-Caspian steppe
Its burial practices resemble the burial practices described in the Kurgan hypothesis of Marija Gimbutas, and it has been speculated that the Maykop culture may have contributed to the Yamnaya culture which is nowadays recognised as the ancestor of most Indo-European languages. According to a 2019 article by David Anthony, 

However, more detailed studies cast doubt on this scenario. The Maykop DNA contains quite a large admixture (30%–40%) of Anatolian Farmer ancestry. Anthony continues:

According to J.P. Mallory, writing in 1987 before ancient DNA evidence became available:

Anthony agrees that the Maykop culture people probably spoke languages which are ancestral to the Northwest Caucasian languages found in the same region today. Nonetheless, their culture seems to have influenced that of the early Indo-Europeans. Anthony writes:

Iranian Plateau
According to Mariya Ivanova the Maykop origins were on the Iranian Plateau:

Azerbaijan
More recently, some very ancient kurgans have been discovered at Soyuqbulaq in Azerbaijan. These kurgans date to the beginning of the 4th millennium BC, and belong to Leylatepe Culture. According to the excavators of these kurgans, there are some significant parallels between Soyugbulaq kurgans and the Maykop kurgans:

See also

 Yamnaya culture

Sources

J. P. Mallory, "Maykop Culture", Encyclopedia of Indo-European culture, Fitzroy Dearborn, 1997.
 Р.М. Мунчаев, Н.Я. Мерперт, Ш.Н. Амиров ТЕЛЛЬ-ХАЗНА I. Культово-административный центр IV–III тыс. до н. э. в Северо-восточной Сирии. Издательство «Палеограф». Москва 2004.

Footnotes

Further reading

External links

Archaeological cultures of Eastern Europe
Bronze Age cultures of Europe
Archaeological sites in Chechnya
Archaeological cultures in Russia
Archaeology of Kuban
Archaeological cultures of the Caucasus
4th millennium BC